Point Mckay is a residential neighbourhood in the northwest quadrant of Calgary, Alberta. It is bounded to the north by Bowness Road and to the south by the Bow River. Edworthy Park is located across the river, and is connected by a bridge to Point Mckay.

It was part of the town of Montgomery before it was annexed to the City of Calgary in 1963. It is represented in the Calgary City Council by the Ward 7 councillor.
The Provincial electoral division is Calgary-Varsity

Demographics

Residents in this community had a median household income of $63,731 in 2000, and there were 9.5% low income residents living in the neighbourhood. As of 2000, 15.2% of the residents were immigrants. A proportion of 37.4% of the buildings were condominiums or apartments, and 25.8% of the housing was used for renting.

Education
The community is served by University Elementary and Queen Elizabeth High School public school.

See also
List of neighbourhoods in Calgary

References

External links
Montgomery Community Association

Neighbourhoods in Calgary